OTP is a collection of useful middleware, libraries, and tools written in the Erlang programming language. It is an integral part of the open-source distribution of Erlang. The name OTP was originally an acronym for Open Telecom Platform, which was a branding attempt before Ericsson released Erlang/OTP as open source. However neither Erlang nor OTP is specific to telecom applications.

The OTP distribution is supported and maintained by the OTP product unit at Ericsson, who released Erlang/OTP as open-source in the late 90s, to ensure its independence from a single vendor and to increase awareness of the language.

It contains:
an Erlang interpreter (which is called BEAM);
an Erlang compiler;
a protocol for communication between servers (nodes);
a CORBA Object Request Broker;
a static analysis tool called Dialyzer;
a distributed database server (Mnesia); and
many other libraries.

History

Early days
Originally named Open System, it was started by Ericsson in late 1995 as a prototype system that aimed to select from a range of appropriate programming technologies and system components, including computers, languages, databases and management systems, to support a remote access system being developed at Ericsson. In the same year, following the collapse of another gigantic C++-based project, Open System was ordered to provide support when it restarted from scratch using Erlang. The result was the highly successful AXD301 system, a new ATM switch, announced in 1998. Open System system was later named Open Telecom Platform (OTP) when the first prototype was delivered in May 1996. OTP has also become a specific product unit within Ericsson since then, providing management, support and further development.

The early OTP system components in 1998:
 Distributed application management
 SASL - error logging, release handling
 OS resource monitoring
 EVA - protocol independent event/alarm handling
 Mnesia - real-time active data replication  
 SNMP - operations and maintenance interface
 INETS - simple HTTP support

A key subsystem in OTP is the System Architecture Support Libraries (SASL), which gave a framework for writing applications. The early version of SASL provided:
 Start-up scripts
 An application concept
 Behaviours (design patterns)
 Error handling
 Debugging
 High-level software upgrade in runtime without shutdown

The behaviours provide programmers with yet higher abstractions for efficient program design. The early version included:
 Supervision
 Servers
 Event handling
 Finite-state machines

OTP Components 
The OTP components can be divided into six categories:

 Basic Applications - Basic Erlang/OTP functionality.
 Compiler A compiler for Erlang modules.
 Kernel Functionality necessary to run Erlang/OTP itself.
 SASL (System Architecture Support Libraries) A set of tools for code replacement and alarm handling etc.
 Stdlib The standard library.
Operations and Maintenance - OAM both of the system developed by the user and of Erlang/OTP itself.
 EVA A multi-featured event and alarm handler.
 OS_Mon A monitor which allows inspection of the underlying operating system.
 SNMP SNMP support including a MIB compiler and tools for creating SNMP agents.
 Interface and Communication - Interoperability and protocols support.
 Asn1 Support for ASN.1.
 Comet A library that enables Erlang/OTP to call COM objects on windows
 Crypto Cryptographical support
 Erl_Interface Low level interface to C.
 GS A graphics system used to write platform independent user interfaces.
 Inets A set of services such as a web server and a FTP client.
 Jinterface Low level interface to Java.
 SSL Secure Socket Layer (SSL), interface to UNIX BSD sockets
 Database Management.
 QLC Query language support for Mnesia DBMS.
 Mnesia A heavy duty real-time distributed database.
 ODBC ODBC database interface.
 CORBA services and IDL compiler.
 cosEvent Orber OMG Event Service.
 cosNotification Orber OMG Notification Service.
 cosTime Orber OMG Timer and TimerEvent Services.
 cosTransactions Orber OMG Transaction Service.
 IC IDL compiler
 Orber A CORBA object request broker.
 Tools.
 Appmon A utility used to view OTP applications.
 Debugger For debugging and testing of Erlang programs.
 Parsetools A set of parsing and lexical analysis tools.
 Pman A process manager used to inspect the state of an Erlang/OTP system.
 Runtime_Tools Tools to include in a production system.
 Toolbar A tool bar simplifying access to the Erlang/OTP tools.
 Tools A set of programming tools including a coverage analyzer etc.
 TV An ETS and Mnesia graphical table visualizer.

Applications in OTP
As of OTP 18.2, the following applications are included in the Erlang/OTP distribution:
 asn1	
 common_test	
 compiler
 cosEvent
 cosEventDomain
 cosFileTransfer
 cosNotification
 cosProperty
 cosTime
 cosTransactions
 crypto
 debugger
 dialyzer
 diameter
 edoc
 eldap
 erl_docgen
 erl_interface
 erts		
 et
 eunit
 gs
 hipe
 ic
 inets

See also
RabbitMQ
Couchbase Server
Riak

References

Erlang (programming language)